Parmalee is an American country music band.

Parmalee may also refer to:
 Bernie Parmalee (born 1967)
 Paul Parmalee (1926-2006)
 Henry S. Parmalee, American piano maker from New Haven, Connecticut
 Parmalee Transfer Company

See also
 Parmelee (disambiguation)
 Parmele, North Carolina